Shafeeqa Pillay (born 11 February 1985) is a South African former cricketer who played as a right-handed batter and wicket-keeper. She appeared in 12 One Day Internationals for South Africa in 2004 and 2005. She played domestic cricket for Eastern Province and Border.

References

External links
 
 

1985 births
Living people
South African women cricketers
South Africa women One Day International cricketers
People from Uitenhage
Eastern Province women cricketers
Border women cricketers
East Coast women cricketers
Wicket-keepers
Cricketers from the Eastern Cape
20th-century South African women
21st-century South African women